Syspro is a software development and enterprise resource planning company providing integrated business software including accounting, manufacturing, and distribution operations.

History 

Syspro was founded in 1978 by Phil Duff. As of August 2022, Jaco Maritz was CEO and Phil Duff was executive chairman. Rob Stummer is CEO of Asia Pacific and Sridharan Arumugam is the vice president of Asia Pacific.    
In 2014, it reported over 15,000 customers  in more than 60 countries.  

Syspro is marketed through regional distribution centers and a reseller network in the United States, Canada, Africa, Asia Pacific, Australia and the United Kingdom.
Products and services include:
 Enterprise resource planning (ERP)
 Customer relationship management (CRM)
 Point of sale (POS)
 Business process modelling
 Enterprise architecture
 Customization
 Workflow management
 Software as a service (SaaS)
 Service-oriented architecture (SOA)
 Materials Requirement Planning (MRP)

References

See also 
 List of ERP software packages

ERP software companies
Customer relationship management software companies
Software companies established in 1978
South African brands
South African companies established in 1978
Software companies of South Africa
Companies based in Johannesburg